Claude Fortier  (June 11, 1921 – April 22, 1986) was a Canadian physiologist and expert on the pituitary gland. From 1974 to 1975, he was the president of the Royal Society of Canada.

Honours
 In 1970, he was made a Companion of the Order of Canada.
 In 1980, he was awarded the Quebec government's Prix Marie-Victorin. 
 In 1998, he was inducted into the Canadian Medical Hall of Fame.

References

1921 births
1986 deaths
Canadian physiologists
Companions of the Order of Canada
Academic staff of Université Laval